Henricus Theodorus Josephus (Servais) Knaven (born 6 March 1971) is a Dutch professional road bicycle racer, currently a directeur sportif for Team Ineos. He rode at the 1992 Summer Olympics and the 2004 Summer Olympics.

As a rider, Knaven won Paris–Roubaix in 2001 in wet and muddy conditions that soaked the cobblestones. His teammates Johan Museeuw and Romans Vainsteins followed, completing a rare 1-2-3. He is the second rider in history to start and finish the Hell of the North race 16 times. He escaped from a 10 men breakaway to take the win in a mostly flat stage concluding in Bordeaux.

Major results

1991
 1st  National Track Pursuit Amateur Championships
 1st Grote Rivierenprijs
1992
 1st  National Track Pursuit Amateur Championships
 1st  National Track Pursuit Amateur Championships
 1st  Overall Olympia's Tour
1993
 1st Overall Teleflex Tour
1st Stage 4b
 1st  Overall Olympia's Tour
1st Prologue & Stage 9b
 1st Ster van Brabant
1995
 1st  National Road Race Championships
1996
 10th Grand Prix d'Ouverture La Marseillaise
1997
 1st  Overall Danmark Rundt
 1st Prologue Tour of Sweden
 3rd National Road Race Championships
 4th Nokere Koerse
 5th Grand Prix d'Ouverture La Marseillaise
1998
 1st Scheldeprijs
 4th Overall Étoile de Bessèges
1st Stage 1
 5th E3 Prijs Vlaanderen
 8th Omloop Het Volk
1999
 1st Ronde van Midden-Zeeland
 2nd National Road Race Championships
 5th Overall Three Days of De Panne
 7th Omloop Het Volk
2000
 1st Overall Driedaagse van West-Vlaanderen
1st Stage 1
 3rd Overall Ronde van Nederland
 3rd Omloop Het Volk
 3rd Arnhem–Veenendaal Classic
2001
 1st Paris–Roubaix
 4th Overall Danmark Rundt
 6th Dwars door Vlaanderen
 6th Scheldeprijs
 7th Overall Three Days of De Panne
2002
 10th Overall Tour of Belgium
2003
 1st Stage 17 Tour de France
 1st Stage 5 Tour of Qatar
 1st RaboRonde Heerlen
 4th Scheldeprijs
 5th Overall Driedaagse van West-Vlaanderen
 5th Gent–Wevelgem
 7th Paris–Roubaix
2004
 4th Overall Driedaagse van West-Vlaanderen
 7th Dwars door Vlaanderen
2005
 1st Stage 5 Tirreno–Adriatico
 6th Overall Three Days of De Panne
2008
 4th National Time Trial Championships
2010
 1st Ridderronde Maastricht
 9th Batavus Prorace

See also
 List of Dutch Olympic cyclists

References

External links 

Official website 

Official Tour de France results for Servais Knaven

1971 births
Living people
Dutch male cyclists
Dutch Tour de France stage winners
Cyclists at the 1992 Summer Olympics
Cyclists at the 2004 Summer Olympics
Olympic cyclists of the Netherlands
People from Rijnwaarden
Danmark Rundt winners
UCI Road World Championships cyclists for the Netherlands
Cyclists from Gelderland
Dutch track cyclists
20th-century Dutch people
21st-century Dutch people